, prov. designation: , is a resonant trans-Neptunian object and possible dwarf planet located in the outermost region of the Solar System. It was discovered on 21 October 2001 by astronomers of the Deep Ecliptic Survey program at Kitt Peak National Observatory near Tucson, Arizona, United States. , it has not been named.

Classification and orbit 

 has been characterized as a dwarf planet candidate. Based on assumptions and estimates, Michael Brown gives it a "likely"-status on his website, which is the third highest status after "near certainty" and "highly likely" (also see his classification table).

The object orbits the Sun at a distance of 37.0–66.6 AU once every 372 years and 12 months (136,232 days; semi-major axis of 51.82 AU). Its orbit has an eccentricity of 0.29 and an inclination of 1° with respect to the ecliptic. It came to perihelion on 8 October 1937, and has since been moving away from the Sun. In 2006, it moved beyond a distance of 50 AU and is at 53.7 AU . The body's observation arc begins with a precovery, published by the Digitized Sky Survey and taken at the Siding Spring Observatory in July 1982.

Numbering and naming 

 was numbered (42301) by the Minor Planet Center on 26 May 2002. , it has not been named. Acoording to the established naming conventions, it will receive a mythological or mythic name (not necessarily from Classical mythology), in particular one associated with creation.

Physical characteristics 

Lightcurve analysis shows only small deviations, suggesting that  is a spheroid with small albedo spots. Observations with Spitzers Infrared Array Camera were used to study the body's surface composition. The analyzed data indicate the presence of 20% water ice, 60% amorphous silicates, and 20% organic compounds, including complex ones such as tholins.

Diameter and albedo 

See also 
 List of Solar System objects most distant from the Sun

References

External links 
 List Of Centaurs and Scattered-Disk Objects, Minor Planet Center
 The Meudon Multicolor Survey (2MS) of Centaurs and Trans-Neptunian objects
 TNO Colors
 KBO Surface Colors
 Red Planetoid Sedna covered in tar-colored sludge
 Asteroid Lightcurve Database (LCDB), query form (info )
 Discovery Circumstances: Numbered Minor Planets (40001)-(45000), Minor Planet Center
 , Small Bodies Data Ferret
 
 

Trans-Neptunian objects in a 4:9 resonance
Discoveries by the Deep Ecliptic Survey
Possible dwarf planets
20011021